Boyko Aleksiev (born 20 April 1963) is a Bulgarian former competitive figure skater. He represented Bulgaria at six European Championships, three World Championships, and the 1988 Winter Olympics in Calgary.

Competitive highlights

References 

1963 births
Bulgarian male single skaters
Living people
Olympic figure skaters of Bulgaria
Figure skaters at the 1988 Winter Olympics